Clarus may refer to:
  A common Ancient Roman cognomen.
 Clarus or Klaros, a cult center in ancient Greece
 Giulio Claro (1525–1575), an Italian jurist.
 Clarus the dogcow, an Apple Computer icon.
 Saint Clarus, an English missionary martyred in about 894 near the River Epte, Normandy. See Livery Dole